Adarabioyo is a Nigerian surname. Notable people with the surname include:

Fisayo Adarabioyo (born 1995), English footballer 
Tosin Adarabioyo (born 1997), English footballer, brother of Fisayo

Surnames of Nigerian origin